The 2020 Netball Nations Cup was an international netball tournament contested by the national teams of England, Jamaica, New Zealand and South Africa. The tournament, which briefly replaced the annual Quad Series, was hosted by England and played in January 2020. It is not yet known if it will be played beyond the January 2020 series.

Teams

Results (2020 Cup)
England Netball confirmed the fixtures for the January 2020 tournament in September 2019.

Round 1

Round 2

Round 3

Finals

Final standings

References

External links 

International netball competitions hosted by England
2020 in netball
January 2020 sports events in the United Kingdom
2020 in English netball
2020 in South African women's sport
2020 in New Zealand netball
2020 in Jamaican sport
2020 sports events in London